Herschel Harrison Hatch (February 17, 1837 – November 30, 1920) was a politician from the U.S. state of Michigan.

Hatch was born in Morrisville, New York, where he attended the common schools. He graduated from Hamilton College Law School in Clinton, New York, in 1857. He was admitted to the bar and practiced in Morrisville, 1858-1863. Hatch moved to Bay City, Michigan, where he was elected alderman of Bay City at its first organization in 1865. He was judge of probate of Bay County, 1868–1872, a member of the constitutional commission of Michigan in 1873, and a member of the tax commission in 1881.

He was a descendant of John Lothropp (also Lothrop or Lathrop, born Etton, Yorkshire, 1584; died 1653) was an English Anglican clergyman, who became a Congregationalist minister and emigrant to New England. He was the founder of Barnstable, Massachusetts.

His cousin, Jethro A. Hatch, was the first physician in Kentland, Indiana and a Member of the U.S. House of Representatives from Indiana's 10th congressional district.

Hatch was elected as a Republican to the 48th United States Congress, becoming the first to represent Michigan's 10th congressional district, and served from March 4, 1883 to March 4, 1885 in the U.S. House.  Hatch declined to be a candidate for renomination in 1884 and resumed the practice of law.

Herschel H. Hatch moved to Detroit in 1895 and practiced law until 1910, when he retired. After ten years of retirement, he died in Detroit at the age of eighty-seven and is interred in Elm Lawn Cemetery of Bay City.

References

Herschel H. Hatch at The Political Graveyard

1837 births
1920 deaths
Burials in Michigan
Michigan lawyers
Republican Party members of the United States House of Representatives from Michigan
People from Morrisville, New York
Hamilton College (New York) alumni
Politicians from Bay City, Michigan
19th-century American judges
19th-century American lawyers
19th-century American politicians